Crackpot  may refer to:
 A pejorative for an extremist who espouses pseudoscience and is resistant to reason; there are humorous frameworks for measuring degree of pseudo-scientific thinking, such as the crackpot index.
 Crackpot, North Yorkshire, a village in the United Kingdom and home of Crackpot Cave
 Crackpot Hall, a landmark ruin near Keld, North Yorkshire
 a DC comics character, see Blasters (comics)
 Crackpot (band), an Australian music group who recorded for Tummy Touch Records
 "Crackpot", a 1991 episode of the PBS show Shining Time Station

See also
 Crockpot, an unrelated small kitchen appliance for cooking soups and stews